Montgauch is a commune in the Ariège department in southwestern France.

Population

See also 
 Communes of the Ariège department

References 

Communes of Ariège (department)
Ariège communes articles needing translation from French Wikipedia